Tobias Müller (born 7 May 1989) is a footballer from Switzerland who plays midfielder role for FC Muri in the 1. Liga Classic.  He has a side interest in random geometric graphs.

Career 
He was loaned to FC Wohlen of the Challenge League on 19 October 2007, and at the end of the season his loan was extended for another year.

External links
 Tobias Müller at worldfootball.net 

1989 births
Living people
Swiss men's footballers
Swiss Super League players
FC Aarau players
FC Wohlen players
Association football midfielders